WPLM (1390 AM) is a radio station licensed to serve Plymouth, Massachusetts, United States. WPLM broadcasts to the South Shore and Cape Cod areas.  The station is owned by Plymouth Rock Broadcasting Co., Inc.  WPLM simulcasts the soft adult contemporary music format of sister station WPLM-FM (99.1).

History

WPLM signed on August 8, 1955, with WPLM-FM being added on June 25, 1961.  The two stations simulcast all programming from the FM station's launch until October 1997, when the station began to carry the Eastern Massachusetts Financial News Network, based out of WADN (1120 AM, now WBNW), in morning drive. In May 1999, WPLM's simulcast of WBNW was expanded to run from 6a.m. to 6p.m. On January 15, 2015, WPLM returned to a full simulcast with WPLM-FM.

For much of its history, WPLM was branded as "The radio voice of America's Hometown, Cape Cod and the Islands;" its current slogan is relatively recent.

WPLM went silent on June 7, 2018. It resumed operations on June 6, 2019.

References

External links

PLM
Soft adult contemporary radio stations in the United States
Radio stations established in 1955
Plymouth, Massachusetts
Mass media in Plymouth County, Massachusetts
1955 establishments in Massachusetts